The Soemba Mission was a mission on the Indonesian island of Soemba, intended to convert the population to Christianity.

Gallery

Sources
 Tot dankbaarheid genoopt. Gedenkboek ter gelegenheid van den 25-jarigen Zendingsarbeid op Soemba. – J.H. Kok, Kampen – 1927.
 P.J. Lambooy – Sporen van oudere bevolking op Soemba – 1927
 S.J. Paul Goossens – Openbare scheurmaking op Soemba – Een aanklacht en een verweer – 1939 – Druk niet bestemd voor de handel, aanwezig in Universiteitsbibliotheek van de Rijksuniversiteit Groningen
 D.K. Wielenga – De zending op Soemba – Herzien en bijgewerkt door T. van Dijk en Ds. P.J. Luijendijk – Uitgegeven vanwege den Ned. Zendingsraad door Hoenderloo's Uitgeverij en Drukkerij, 1949.
 D.K. Wielenga – Soemba – Uitgegeven door den Zendingsraad-Studieraad, In den handel gebracht door de NV Algemeene boekhandel voor inwendige- en uitwendige zending te 's Gravenhage
 M.C. Capelle – D.s. D.K. Wielenga, grondlegger der zending onder de Soembanezen – serie: Lichtstralen op de akker der wereld nr 3 – uitgegeven door J.N. Voorhoeve, Den Haag – 1952
 J.D. Wielenga – Weerzien op Soemba, fragmenten uit een dagboek – Libellen-serie No. 65/66 – Bosch & Keuning, Baarn
 Cultuur als antwoord, verzamelde opstellen van prof. dr. L. Onvlee, uitgegeven ter gelegenheid van zijn tachtigste verjaardag, 23 November 1973, Den Haag, Martinus Nijhoff
 Th. van den End, Gereformeerde Zending op Sumba (1859–1972). 1987
 W.B. van Halsema – De zending voorbij – Kok, Kampen – 1995
 Mondelinge overlevering door Kuno van Dijk aan W.K. van Dijk Jr.

External links
DVD Java Soemba film (1928)
Ds. Van Dijk (e.a.) (1928)
Ds. Pieter Luijendijk
Vertrek naar Soemba door fam. Luijendijk
Over de Soembanese kerk

Dutch East Indies
Christianity in Indonesia
Christian missions in Asia
Dutch colonial architecture in Indonesia